Defence of the Realm might refer to:

 Defence of the Realm, a 1985 political thriller film
 Defence of the Realm, a 1996 documentary about the workings of the British Armed Forces under the MoD
 The Defence of the Realm, a 2009 history of MI5 by Christopher Andrew
 Defence of the Realm Act 1803, an act of the United Kingdom parliament
 Defence of the Realm Act 1914, an act of the United Kingdom parliament
 Defence of the Realm Act 1915, an act of the United Kingdom parliament